Hedeniya is a village in Sri Lanka. It is located within Central Province. Kurunegala Kandy main road is across Hedeniya village. In middle of the Hedeniya town is faces to the Hedeniya Pujapitiya sub way which linked to Ankumbura, Halgolla, Watagoda,  Galhinna, Dolapihilla, Pujapitiya, Bokkawala,   Gallellagama, Doranegama villages and Ranawana to Kandy road. Pallekotuwa road started from Hedeniya town.

Idamegama central college is in near to the hedeniya around 2 km far away.

See also
List of towns in Central Province, Sri Lanka

External links

References 

Populated places in Kandy District